Typhoon Meranti was the first of the record nine named storms to develop during August within the 2004 Pacific typhoon season. Forming from an area of low pressure on August 3, Meranti gradually strengthened. On August 5, the storm underwent a brief period of rapid intensification, attaining its peak intensity later that day. According to the Japan Meteorological Agency, the storm attained winds of  10-minute winds) while the Joint Typhoon Warning Center reported that the storm attained winds of  1-minute winds). The following day, the typhoon quickly weakened to a tropical storm due to unfavorable conditions. By August 9, the system completed an extratropical transition; the remnants of the storm persisted until August 13, at which time it was absorbed by a large, non-tropical low.

Meteorological history

Little deep convection accompanied the weak system despite being situated within an area of moderate diffluence and weak to moderate wind shear. Initially, the system was thought to have been much closer to Wake Island; however, following the development of deep convection, the location of the center of circulation was corrected. Around 0000 UTC on August 3, the Japan Meteorological Agency (JMA), the Regional Specialized Meteorological Center for the western Pacific basin, designated the system as a tropical depression. Development continued as the depression moved into an area of divergence near a tropical upper-tropospheric trough cell. Several hours after the JMA issued their advisory on the depression, the Joint Typhoon Warning Center (JTWC) issued a Tropical Cyclone Formation Alert, stating that the system was likely to develop into a tropical storm within 24 hours.

Later on August 3, the JTWC issued their first advisory on the storm, classifying it as Tropical Depression 14W. Located to the west of a mid-level ridge, the depression was steered towards the north. Early the next day, the JTWC upgraded 14W to a tropical storm; the JMA later upgraded it to a tropical storm around 1200 UTC. At that time, the storm received the name Meranti, a name that was contributed by Cambodia. Little intensification took place until August 5, at which time convection became increasingly organized and underwent a brief period of rapid intensification. By 1200 UTC, both the JMA and JTWC upgraded Meranti to a typhoon.

Upon attaining typhoon status, Meranti turned towards the northeast in response to a strengthening near-equatorial ridge south of the typhoon. Visible satellite images of the typhoon depicted a small, ragged eye within a well-developed cyclone. Gale-force winds extended  at this time. Well-developed outflow allowed the storm to maintain its peak intensity for roughly 18 hours before dry air became entrained in the circulation. The combined effects of decreasing sea surface temperatures and increasing wind shear caused Meranti to quickly weaken. By 0600 UTC on August 6, the eye was no longer visible on satellite imagery and several hours later deep convection rapidly diminished, leading to both agencies downgrading the typhoon to a tropical storm.

Later on August 6, the weakening trend briefly halted as outflow significantly improved due to an area of low pressure north of Meranti. However, wind shear drastically increased, displacing convection to the northwest of the circulation center. By this time, the storm began to undergo an extratropical transition. Due to the influence of a major shortwave trough approaching from the west, Meranti took a sharp northward turn. The JTWC issued their final advisory on the weakening cyclone around 0600 UTC on August 8. The JMA continued to monitor Meranti as a tropical cyclone until August 9. Shortly after becoming extratropical, the remnants of the storm executed a slow, counter-clockwise loop until August 12. Shortly after crossing the International Date Line on August 13, the storm was absorbed by a large non-tropical low over the Bering Sea.

Impact
As Typhoon Meranti never threatened any land masses, no watches or warnings were issued in response to the storm. Although Meranti passed near Wake Island as a tropical depression, no effects were recorded.

See also

2004 Pacific typhoon season
List of storms named Meranti

References

External links

JMA General Information of Typhoon Meranti (0412) from Digital Typhoon
JMA Best Track Data of Typhoon Meranti (0412) 
JMA Best Track Data (Graphics) of Typhoon Meranti (0412)
JMA Best Track Data (Text)
JTWC Best Track Data of Typhoon 14W (Meranti)
14W.MERANTI from the U.S. Naval Research Laboratory

2004 Pacific typhoon season
Typhoons
Tropical cyclones in 2004